Municipality of Quebracho may refer to:
 Municipality of Quebracho, Paysandú, one of the 7 municipalities of the Department of Paysandú, Uruguay
 Municipality of Quebracho, Cerro Largo, one of the 15 municipalities of the Department of Cerro Largo, Uruguay